Presidential elections were held in Turkey on 24 June 2018 as part of the 2018 general election, alongside parliamentary elections on the same day. They were the first direct presidential elections, following the constitutional amendments approved in a 2017 referendum. Previously, presidents had been elected by the Members of Parliament.

The elections were originally scheduled for November 2019. President Erdoğan and MHP Chairman Bahçeli called for early elections, giving as reason to "not wait any longer" for the entry into force of the 2017 constitutional amendments. Following this, with the 2018 elections, the office of prime minister was abolished and the first government under the presidential system took office.

Incumbent President Erdoğan declared his candidacy for the People's Alliance on 27 April 2018. The main opposition, the Republican People's Party, nominated Muharrem İnce, a member of parliament known for his combative opposition and spirited speeches against Erdoğan. The Peoples' Democratic Party nominated Selahattin Demirtaş, its imprisoned former chairman. Besides these candidates, Meral Akşener, the founder and leader of the İyi Party, Temel Karamollaoğlu, the leader of the Felicity Party, and Doğu Perinçek, the leader of the Patriotic Party, announced their candidacies and collected the 100,000 signatures required to stand.

Campaigning centred mainly on the faltering economy and the currency and debt crisis, with both government and opposition commentators warning of a more serious economic crisis following the elections. The 2018 Gaza border protests, following the United States recognition of Jerusalem as capital of Israel, along with the Turkish military operation in Afrin, also featured in the campaign.

Electoral system

The President of Turkey is directly elected through the two-round system, under which a candidate must obtain at least 50%+1 of the popular vote in order to be elected. If no candidate secures an overall majority outright, then a runoff is held between the two most voted-for candidates from the first round, the winner of which is then declared elected. The first direct election to the Turkish presidency was held in 2014, after a referendum in 2007 abolished the previous system under which the head of state was elected by the legislature, the Grand National Assembly of Turkey. The President of Turkey is subject to term limits, and may serve at most two consecutive five-year terms.

Prospective presidential candidates must be at least 40 years old and must have completed higher education. Any political party that has won 5% of the vote in the previous parliamentary election can put forward a candidate, although parties that have not met this threshold can form alliances and field joint candidates as long as their total vote share exceeds 5%. Independents can run if they collect 100,000 signatures from the electorate. An estimate released in July 2017 predicted that collecting 100,000 signatures to stand for election could exceed ₺15 million (US$4.2 million) in costs, if each individual signature would require certification by a notary. However, the Supreme Electoral Council of Turkey (YSK) announced that signature collection would occur between 4 and 9 May, with voters having to submit their nominations at their local electoral council branch.

Based on the results of the previous general election in November 2015, only the Justice and Development Party (AKP), Republican People's Party (CHP), Nationalist Movement Party (MHP) and Peoples' Democratic Party (HDP) are eligible to field candidates for the presidential election. The remaining parties combined received under 3% of the vote and are thus unable to field either a joint candidate or a candidate in their own right. In addition to past election results, parties which have a parliamentary group can nominate a candidate. Thus, the newly formed İyi Party was also eligible to nominate their candidate, as 15 CHP members of parliament had defected to them with the intention of allowing the party to form a parliamentary group. However, İyi Party leader and presidential candidate Meral Akşener insisted on being nominated by collecting signatures rather than through parliament.

Candidates

Official candidates
The Supreme Electoral Council (YSK) formally announced the candidates on 13 May.

Selection process

In the run-up to the election, various parties underwent a candidate selection process to nominate presidential candidates.

People's Alliance (AKP and MHP)

Serving president Recep Tayyip Erdoğan was widely seen as the undisputed candidate of the People's Alliance, an alliance set up by the governing Justice and Development Party (AKP) and the far-right Nationalist Movement Party (MHP). This was confirmed by MHP leader Devlet Bahçeli on 21 April 2018. The AKP parliamentary group voted unanimously to nominate Erdoğan on 3 May.

Republican People's Party (CHP)

The main opposition Republican People's Party (CHP) began a wide search for a candidate, with several rumours that the party was content with supporting a cross-party candidate that was not necessarily in line with the party's values as part of an election alliance. CHP leader Kemal Kılıçdaroğlu subsequently conducted several meetings with the leaders of the Felicity Party and the İyi Party. Former President Abdullah Gül was mentioned as a cross-party option, allegedly receiving the support of senior officials, but was disbanded following heavy opposition from the lower ranks and voters. Gül eventually announced that he would not stand, citing the lack of cross-party consensus. Despite ruling it out several times, party leader Kemal Kılıçdaroğlu was frequently mentioned as a potential candidate, along with Yılmaz Büyükerşen, İlhan Kesici, Muharrem İnce and Mehmet Haberal. Certain MPs, such as Öztürk Yılmaz and Didem Engin also publicly declared their interest. On 26 April, CHP MP Özgür Özel, himself seen as a potential candidate, announced that their nominee would be one who would make the AKP 'crazy' the most. On 4 May, Yalova MP Muharrem İnce was declared the party's candidate.

Peoples' Democratic Party (HDP)

The HDP nominated Selahattin Demirtaş, their former leader who was also the HDP's candidate in 2014, on 4 May. It was reported that the party executive had broadly agreed on Demirtaş earlier, raising concern that his preventative detention since 2016 could potentially bar him from running. Originally due in court on 11 April, Demirtaş's trial for charges of 'spreading terrorist propaganda' was delayed to 30 April, and then again to 8 June. His candidacy was announced as a part of a 'broad coalition of Kurdish and left-wing parties'. His lawyers and HDP officials claimed that his detention wouldn't affect his candidacy. In his first message after announcing his candidacy, he called on his supporters to be his 'hands and arms' during the campaign.

İyi Party

Upon announcing the İyi Party's establishment on 25 October 2017, party leader Meral Akşener announced that she would be a candidate in the presidential election. She reaffirmed her candidacy on 18 April 2018, shortly after the election was called. The party subsequently received pressure from the CHP and the Felicity Party (SP) to enter a joint alliance and support a cross-party candidate, with the SP supporting Abdullah Gül. Akşener refused to withdraw her candidacy, with the party's General Administration Council voting unanimously to nominate her as their party candidate on 24 April 2018.

Felicity Party (SP)

In the run-up to the election, SP leader Temel Karamollaoğlu managed to carry his party to the mainstream media following a number of speeches where he heavily criticised the government. This led to the SP being regarded as a potential kingmaker in future alliances, causing several larger parties to approach Karamollaoğlu in a bid to field a joint candidate. Although this led to the Nation Alliance being established between the SP, CHP and the İyi Party, no consensus was reached on a joint presidential candidate and each party decided to nominate their own. The SP polled their members on four potential candidates, namely Karamollaoğlu, Abdullah Gül, Haşim Kılıç and Abdüllatif Şener. Karamollaoğlu was announced as the party's candidate on 1 May.

Others

The left-wing Patriotic Party declared their leader Doğu Perinçek as their candidate. As part of a triple alliance of small centre-right parties consisting of the Motherland Party (ANAP), the True Path Party (DYP) and the Justice Party (AP), the AP's leader Vecdet Öz was nominated as a joint candidate. As independents, journalist Levent Gültekin and Tuna Bekleviç declared their intentions to run.

Nominations

The Constitution of Turkey, amended following the 2017 constitutional referendum, allows any party with a parliamentary group (at least 20 MPs) to nominate a presidential candidate. This meant that the AKP, CHP, HDP, MHP and technically the İyi Party were eligible to automatically nominate candidates through parliament. Meral Akşener, the İyi Party's leader and presidential candidate, opted to be nominated through signatures instead. The MHP, as part of the People's Alliance, did not field a candidate and announced support for the AKP candidate Recep Tayyip Erdoğan. The CHP formally nominated Muharrem İnce and the HDP nominated Selahattin Demirtaş. The remaining candidates were required to collect at least 100,000 signatures.

Voters were able to give signatures to their preferred presidential candidate between 4 May and 9 May at their local electoral council branch. They were only permitted to nominate one candidate. The number of signatures needed to formally become a candidate was 100,000. Seven candidates applied to the YSK to seek nomination by signatures, with three applications being rejected due to insufficient paperwork. As a result, the remaining four successful applicants were as follows.

Meral Akşener, Leader of the İyi Party
Temel Karamollaoğlu, Leader of the Felicity Party
Doğu Perinçek, Leader of the Patriotic Party
Vecdet Öz, Leader of the Justice Party

Voters abroad were not eligible to give signatures, prompting Perinçek to appeal to the Constitutional Court, arguing that the YSK had violated the rights of Turkish citizens abroad. Overseas citizens were, however, allowed to send a signed declaration by post to their local electoral council in Turkey. Only 72 overseas citizens did so, with 17 signing for Akşener, 18 signing for Karamollaoğlu, 35 signing for Perinçek and no signatures for Öz.

Campaign

Erdoğan campaign

Recep Tayyip Erdoğan, incumbent President of Turkey since 2014, was officially nominated as the presidential candidate of the Justice and Development Party (AKP) on 3 May 2018. Shortly thereafter, the nominally oppositional Nationalist Movement Party (MHP) reiterated that it would endorse Erdoğan's candidacy, and would jointly apply to the electoral commission for its formal registration. In early May, it was confirmed by Erdoğan that he would be visiting the Bosnian capital of Sarajevo in the early stages of the campaign, most likely on 20 May 2018, and hold campaign rallies with the Bosnian Turks to drum up support for his re-election bid.

İnce campaign

Muharrem İnce, a member of parliament for Yalova, was announced as the presidential candidate of the Republican People's Party (CHP) on 3 May 2018. On the following day, 4 May, party leader Kemal Kilicdaroglu formally proclaimed the CHP's support for İnce. Shortly thereafter, the CHP began preparations for the campaign season, launching the production of campaign material and merchandise. It was revealed in early May that İnce's campaign would adopt the slogan "Türkiye'ye güvence Muharrem İnce", roughly translating to "Muharrem İnce, an assurance to Turkey", and that it would be kicked off with an election rally in his home city of Yalova on 5 May.

Demirtaş campaign

Selahattin Demirtaş was officially announced as the candidate of the People's Democratic Party (HDP) on 4 May 2018, after members of the party had hinted at his candidacy weeks in advance. Party leader Pervin Buldan declared that Demirtaş, a jailed former co-chair of the HDP, would be leading a five-party "Kurdish alliance" into the general election.

Akşener campaign

Meral Akşener was nominated as the candidate of the İyi Party on 4 May 2018, after she had successfully collected the 100,000 signatures required for minor party candidates to gain ballot access. Reportedly, she passed this threshold less than four hours after having launched her signature collection campaign.

Karamollaoğlu campaign

Temel Karamollaoğlu was nominated as the candidate of the Felicity Party (SP) on 6 May 2018, after he had successfully collected the 100,000 signatures required for minor party candidates to gain ballot access. Karamollaoğlu's campaign adopted the slogan "Türkiye'ye bilge başkan" ("A wise leader for Turkey").

Perinçek campaign 

Doğu Perinçek was nominated as the candidate of the VATAN Party on 9 May 2018, after he had successfully collected the 100,000 signatures required for minor party candidates to gain ballot access.

Endorsements

Parties

NGOs and unions

Controversies

State of emergency

On 20 July 2016, five days after an attempted coup, the government declared a state of emergency (Turkish: Olağanüstü Hal, OHAL), allowing ministers to rule the country by decree, bypassing parliament and limiting certain civil freedoms. The government have frequently been criticised for violating the constitutional limits of a state of emergency, using it as an excuse for governing without any political opposition. Since 2016, the state of emergency has been extended for the sixth time, with parliament voting to extend it by a further three months on 18 January 2018. The extension led to speculation that the election would occur under state of emergency conditions, similar to the 2017 constitutional referendum.

Heather Nauert, the Spokesperson for the United States Department of State and acting Under Secretary of State for Public Diplomacy and Public Affairs, issued a statement on 20 April citing 'concern' for whether free and fair elections would be possible under a state of emergency. On 24 April, the Parliamentary Assembly of the Council of Europe (PACE) issued a statement calling for the elections to be delayed, declaring that they would not meet European standards or be held in a democratic manner. Prince Zeid bin Ra'ad, the United Nations High Commissioner for Human Rights, also issued a statement calling for the state of emergency to end in order to guarantee credible elections.

The calls to end the state of emergency were criticised by the Turkish government and loyal members of parliament, who called the PACE declaration 'politicised, unfair, unjust and beyond the limits'. Prime minister Binali Yıldırım criticised PACE for being 'non-credible' due to it having invited Democratic Union Party (PYD) chairman Salih Muslim, who is regarded as a terrorist leader by Turkey, to give a speech. The Ministry of Foreign Affairs declared Nauert's statements about a forthcoming election 'unacceptable'.

Media censorship
Following his nomination as the CHP's presidential candidate on 4 May, Muharrem İnce began his campaign with a rally in his hometown of Yalova. It was noted that only pro-opposition TV channels such as Halk TV were covering the event, with the state broadcaster TRT notably absent. In his next rally at Balıkesir, İnce declared that if TRT were to continue not broadcasting opposition campaigns, he would march to the TRT headquarters with the CHP's 130 MPs and conduct his next rally in front of them.

A similar situation was observed during the İyi Party's first extraordinary congress on 1 April, which was only covered by Halk TV. In response, party leader Meral Akşener claimed that she had not embarked on her campaign with any expectations from 'the government's media'. The party subsequently sent the TRT photos from the congress, an abacus and a calculator as a 'present', so that they could count how many people attended the event.

Election violence

On 7 May, a group armed with knives and clubs consisting of allegedly 50 to 60 people approached an İyi Party election stand in Bağcılar, İstanbul, wounding 8 people with one in critical condition. The group allegedly consisted of rival Nationalist Movement Party (MHP) campaigners, many of which had reportedly been suspended from the party for past violent activity. A total of 8 people were arrested following the attack, with six being released and two being charged afterwards.

On 8 May, the house of İyi Party founding member Mehmet Aslan in Beykoz, İstanbul was shot at by unknown assailants. Aslan was not in the building at the time.

On 26 May, a group of Felicity Party and Nationalist Movement Party (MHP) activists engaged in a brawl in Ankara following a dispute over hanging up party flags. Clubs were used by MHP activists, injuring 7 Felicity Party activists with two in serious condition. Felicity Party MP candidate for Ankara, Mehmet Fethi Öztürk, was among the two seriously injured. Gunshots were also reported, which were blamed on Öztürk and led to his arrest while in hospital.

Nomination irregularities
The Supreme Electoral Council of Turkey (YSK) had devised a system to collect signatures for voters to nominate candidates, with the process taking place between 4 and 9 May. On 8 May, Patriotic Party leader Doğu Perinçek, who by that time was close to reaching the 100,000 signatures needed for nomination, criticised the system for irregularities. Perinçek claimed that the system has crashed throughout 8 May, affecting people who wanted to give signatures, criticising the government for incompetence. The crashes in the system caused doubt about whether Perinçek would reach the required 100,000 signatures by the 9 May deadline. Regardless, Perinçek managed to surpass 100,000 signatures by noon on 9 May.

Leaked speech 
During a leaked speech of a private meeting with AKP officials, Erdoğan ordered them to go in a great number as official representatives in voting locations to seize control of the ballot boxes, ensuring that the "work there would be finished before it even started". He also ordered them to target HDP voters with the help of AKP local officials who he assured them would be in possession of voters lists to help with their "special work". This would be done in order to prevent HDP crossing the 10% electoral threshold, which would greatly help the AKP and prevent a repeat of the "7 June experience", when the AKP lost its parliamentary majority in an upset defeat.

Opinion polls

Opinion polls have been conducted to gauge voter intentions for the presidential election. Polls have generally shown a clear lead for Recep Tayyip Erdoğan, though with vote totals below his 2014 election victory where he was elected with 51.8% of the vote outright. Indicating that a second round will most likely take place, the polls indicate that there is competition between Muharrem İnce and Meral Akşener over who will proceed to the run-off and face Erdoğan. Emboldened vote shares indicate percentages above 50%, indicating outright first round victory.

Graphical summary

Voting intention

Results

By demographic groups

Notes

References

Presidential
Presidential elections in Turkey
Presidential
Turkey
Turkey